Peschisolido is an Italian surname. Notable people with the surname include:

Joe Peschisolido (born 1963), Canadian lawyer and politician
Paul Peschisolido (born 1971), Canadian soccer manager and player

Italian-language surnames